The IAe.31 Colibrí ("Hummingbird") was a civil trainer aircraft developed in Argentina in the 1940s.

Design and development
It was designed by Émile Dewoitine and developed by the Instituto Aerotécnico for manufacture by the company H. Goberna factories in Córdoba Province as an initiative under President Juan Perón's first five year plan.

The design used the AeC.3G of the early 1930s as a starting point, but was a considerably modernized aircraft. Like the AeC.3G, however, it was a conventional low-wing cantilever monoplane with seating for student pilot and instructor in tandem and fixed tailwheel undercarriage. Unlike its predecessor, the cockpits were enclosed under a long canopy. Only three examples were built.

Specifications

See also

References

 
 Bridgeman, Leonard. Jane's All The World's Aircraft 1950-1951 edition New York: The Mcgraw.Hill Book Company, Inc, 1950 Pg.9c(No ISBN)

1940s Argentine civil trainer aircraft
FMA aircraft
Low-wing aircraft
Single-engined tractor aircraft
Conventional landing gear